The Latvian Association of Regions or Latvian Regional Alliance (LRA) is a centrist political party in Latvia.

It was founded as an alliance on 13 March 2014 and is headed by former Unity MP Edvards Smiltēns.

History 
The alliance won 8 seats in the Saeima at the 2014 parliamentary election. The first leader of the LRA was Mārtiņš Bondars until stepping down and leaving the alliance in 2017, after which he was succeeded by Nellija Kleinberga. 

In the lead up to the 2018 elections, the LSDSP and the Christian Democrats left the alliance, which eventually fell just short of the 5% barrier at the polls. An even closer result came in the 2019 European Parliament elections, where the LRA lacked 0.02 percent to reach the minimum threshold of votes needed for gaining a seat.

On 22 August 2020, two of the parties making up the alliance – For Ogre Municipality and the Regional Alliance voted to reorganize LRA into a single political party. The other members – the Vidzeme Party and three NGOs voted to continue as affiliated cooperation partners under the LRA banner.

In May 2022 the LRA formed a united list for the 2022 Saeima elections together with the Latvian Green Party (former ZZS member), the Liepāja Party (former ZZS partner) and an upcoming political NGO led by Liepāja construction contractor Uldis Pīlēns. The interim name of the ticket was reported as "United List of Latvia" or "Latvia United List" (previously "Power of Regions" (Reģionu spēks) was suggested). The NGO led by Pīlēns scheduled its founding event for July 1st and announced that it would be called Apvienotais Latvijas saraksts or the United List.

Election results

Legislative elections

European Parliament

References

External links
Official website 

Centrist parties in Latvia
Regionalist parties
2014 establishments in Latvia
Political parties established in 2014